Lisa Stewart (born August 6, 1968) is an American country music artist, actress, and  television host. In 1993, she signed to BNA Records (then known as BNA Entertainment), releasing her self-titled debut album that year. This album produced two singles for her on the Billboard Hot Country Songs chart. She penned BMI's 2008 Gospel Song of The Year, "Sky Full of Angels" made popular by Reba McEntire. Stewart is also known for her acting career. Most notably, she has shared the silver screen with Academy Award winners Gwyneth Paltrow ("Country Strong" 2010) and Melissa Leo in the Sundance award-winning film, "Novitiate". She was featured in The CW's "The Vampire Diaries","Containment" and various films, TV series and commercials. Stewart is currently writing music and performing live shows.

Life and career
Stewart was born August 6, 1968, in Louisville, Mississippi. She first sang in public at age six in her church. Five years later, she attended a Tent Show at the Nashville Fan Fair, where she gave her first country performance. By 1987, Stewart had moved to Nashville, Tennessee, where she won the Roy Acuff scholarship at Belmont University and found work as a studio singer.

While performing at a wedding reception in 1991, Stewart was noticed by Mark Thompson, Wynonna Judd's bandleader, who asked Stewart to sing demos for him. After recording the demos, Stewart signed to a recording contract with BNA Entertainment (now known as BNA Records), releasing her debut single "Somebody's in Love" in late 1992. This song was the first of three singles from her self-titled debut album, followed by "Under the Light of the Texaco" and "Drive Time". Also included on the album was a cover of Jeannie Seely's 1966 single "Don't Touch Me".

In addition to promoting her album on radio tours, Stewart hosted the nationally syndicated entertainment news show #1 Country. She also made appearances on The Nashville Network, hosting their programs Yesteryear and This Week in Country Music and was a featured performer on "Music City Tonight". She continued to tour throughout the 1990s.

Stewart began acting in the 21st century under her married name of Lisa Stewart Seals, but is currently known as Lisa Stewart.

Discography

Albums

Singles

Music videos

References

External links

1968 births
American women country singers
American country singer-songwriters
Living people
Singer-songwriters from Mississippi
BNA Records artists
People from Louisville, Mississippi
Country musicians from Mississippi
21st-century American women